Tacoma Rail  is a publicly owned Class III shortline railroad. It is owned by the city of Tacoma, Washington and operated as a public utility. It is one of three operating divisions of the municipally-owned Tacoma Public Utilities service, but unlike other city services, the railroad is self-supported and generates revenue for the City of Tacoma and Washington state. Tacoma Rail provides freight switching services, serving the Port of Tacoma and customers in Tacoma, south Pierce County and parts of Thurston County.

Operating divisions 
Tacoma Rail operates three distinct divisions:

Tidelands division 
The Tidelands division serves the area around the Port of Tacoma, including all four intermodal terminals and interchanging with both the BNSF Railway and the Union Pacific Railroad. The division serves 40 customers, and handles the majority of Tacoma Rail’s traffic.

The division was established in 1914 as a streetcar line to move port workers, but has been freight-only since 1937. In the past, the division was called the Tacoma Municipal Belt Line.

Lakewood division 

The Lakewood division runs between Tacoma and DuPont. The operation of the division was acquired from BNSF Railway in November 2004.

The division serves 11 customers, mostly in the Lakewood area. Sound Transit also owns tracks has trackage rights between Tacoma and Lakewood to operate its Sounder commuter rail. WSDOT has paid to improve the line in recent years with plans to reroute the Amtrak Cascades and Coast Starlight to the tracks by 2019.

Mountain division 
The Mountain division runs between Tacoma and Frederickson, where it splits into two branches, one serving McKenna, the other serving Eatonville and Morton.

The 97 miles of track are owned directly by the City of Tacoma and are operated by Tacoma Rail under contract. It is considered a separate railroad and is operated using its own TRMW reporting mark. This segment of track was originally built by the Milwaukee Road and later used by the 2nd Chehalis Western Railroad and was purchased by the city on August 12, 1994.

The division serves 14 customers, mostly in the Frederickson area. The Mount Rainier Scenic Railroad leases the portion of track from Eatonville to Morton for passenger excursion service.

Locomotive fleet
Locomotive fleet (as of March 2021)

References

External links

 
 

Washington (state) railroads
Switching and terminal railroads
Tacoma Public Utilities
Transportation in Tacoma, Washington
American companies established in 1994